Shean Patrick Donovan (born January 22, 1975) is a Canadian professional ice hockey coach and former player. Donovan played in 951 games with seven National Hockey League (NHL) clubs during a career that stretched from 1994 to 2010. His nickname is "The Storm", which he gave himself.  He currently serves as a development coach with the NHL's Ottawa Senators. Donovan was born in Timmins, Ontario, but grew up in North Bay, Ontario.

Playing career
A winger with great skating ability, Donovan was drafted by the San Jose Sharks 27th overall in the 1993 NHL Entry Draft and played his first full season in 1995–96. He spent four seasons with the Sharks before being traded to the Colorado Avalanche where he spent three seasons, contributing 13 goals and 19 assists before being traded to the Atlanta Thrashers in 1999.

He was claimed on waivers by the Pittsburgh Penguins in 2002, then traded to the Calgary Flames in 2003, where he had a breakout season in 2003–04, scoring 18 goals in the regular season, and was part of the playoff run which saw the Flames defeat the Vancouver Canucks, Detroit Red Wings, and San Jose Sharks before falling to the Tampa Bay Lightning by a single goal in Game 7 of the Stanley Cup Final. Donovan stated in an interview in April 2011 "That is kind of a bittersweet moment, not winning, but in the end going there was a great memory."

Donovan played for Genève-Servette HC in the Swiss Nationalliga A during the 2004–05 lockout, and returned to the Flames for the 2005–06 season. On July 2, 2006, Donovan was then signed by the Boston Bruins as a free agent to a two-year deal, with the intention of bringing more speed and energy to the Bruins.

At the conclusion of the 2006–07 season, on July 17, 2007, Donovan was traded by the Bruins to the Ottawa Senators for Peter Schaefer.

Donovan played for the Senators until the end of the 2009–10 season, when he became an unrestricted free agent. He was unable to attract NHL interest before the start of the 2010–11 season. In November Anaheim Ducks were looking for a veteran player and they wanted him try out with the Syracuse Crunch. November 1, 2010, he signed a professional try-out contract with the Syracuse Crunch of the American Hockey League (AHL). However a little under a week later and still to make an appearance with the Crunch, Donovan decided to walk away from his try-out to return home on November 7. Donovan claimed that he was missing his family, his home in Ottawa and decided to retire from professional hockey.

Donovan is currently a development coach with the Senators, along with Chris Kelly.

Career statistics

Regular season and playoffs

International

References

External links

1975 births
Living people
Atlanta Thrashers players
Boston Bruins players
Calgary Flames players
Canadian ice hockey coaches
Canadian ice hockey right wingers
Colorado Avalanche players
Genève-Servette HC players
Ice hockey people from Ontario
Kansas City Blades players
Kentucky Thoroughblades players
Ottawa 67's players
Ottawa Senators coaches
Ottawa Senators players
Ottawa Senators scouts
Pittsburgh Penguins players
San Jose Sharks draft picks
San Jose Sharks players
Sportspeople from North Bay, Ontario
Sportspeople from Timmins